Schokking is a Dutch surname. Notable people with the surname include:

 Jan Schokking (1864–1941), Dutch politician and minister
 Wim Schokking (1900–1960), Dutch politician

Dutch-language surnames